The Battle of Gujrat took place in December 1765 between the supreme leader of the whole Chaj Doab territory, Sultan Muqarrab Khan (owed allegiance to Ahmad Shah Abdali) and the Sikh Misls under Charat Singh and Gujar Singh. Muqarrab Khan was defeated in the battle and the Sikhs captured the city where Gujar Singh made Gujrat his capital after repairing and rebuilding the fort with stronger walls.

Background
Gujrat was part of the Chaj Doab territory and in the middle of the town laid the fort that was built during the time of Emperor Akbar, consisted of 8,000 horses and populated with Muslim Gujars and Hindu Khatris. Previously, Muqarrab Khan had defeated the Afghan Yusufzai of Hazara district and Jang Quli Khan Khattak, followed with the capture of Gujrat, establishing the town as his capital in 1758. Muqarrab Khan was a vassal of the Durrani Empire and a supreme leader of the whole Chaj Doab who supported Ahmad Shah Abdali on his campaigns of India and also had his daughter married to the Durrani emperor. To possess the territories that owed allegiance to Durrani empire, Gujar Singh decided to march from Lahore to Chaj Doab with a large army where Charat Singh too joined him.

Battle
In December 1765, Gujar Singh and Charat Singh indulged in a hard-fought battle against Muqarrab Khan who gave a vigorous resistance, particularly at the west bank of River Chenab and then outside the walls of the town but was eventually defeated by the Sikhs, following which Muqarrab Khan rushed into the capital and locked himself inside the fort.  The Sikhs besieged the fort, cutting of all supplies, causing Muqarrab Khan to take a desperate step by riding on an elephant and cutting through the line of the besiegers. With the Sikhs in pursuit, Muqarrab Khan came across a flooded stream and attempted to cross it in desperation but though the elephant made it across the other side of the stream, Muqarrab Khan was no where to be seens and presumed to be drowned. According to Griffin, Muqarrab Khan did make it across the Jhelum river but was captured by rival Ghakhar chief Himmat Khan of Domeli who later executed him.

Aftermath
After the victory and capture of Gujrat, the Sikhs completely sacked the city and Gujar Singh made the town his capital after restructuring the fort with stronger walls. The whole district of Chaj Doab fell under the Sikh domination which was then divided between the two Sikh chiefs, Gujar Singh and Charat Singh.

References 

Battles involving the Durrani Empire
Battles involving the Sikhs